is an underground metro station located in Minato-ku, Nagoya, Aichi, Japan operated by the Nagoya Municipal Subway's Meikō Line. It is located 5.4 kilometers from the terminus of the Meikō Line at Kanayama Station.

History
Tsukiji-guchi Station was opened on 29 March 1971.

Lines

 (Station E06)

Layout
Tsukiji-guchi Station has two underground opposed side platforms.

Platforms

There is one set of gates, beyond which there are four exits.  Each platform has an up escalator and an elevator.  There are coin lockers near Exit 2.  There are bathrooms near Exit 1 and Exit 4, and near Exit 2 and Exit 3.  The bathroom near Exit 2 and 3, and the gates, is also handicapped-accessible and has a baby changing area.  On Platform 1 for Nagoyakō Station, train door 3 is closest to elevator, door 4 is closest to the escalator, and doors 5 and 12 are closest to the stairs.  On the opposite platform, Platform 2 for Kanayama Station, train door 14 is closest to the elevator and doors 6 and 13 are closest to the stairs.

See also
 Tsukiji Shrine

References

External links
 
 Tsukiji-guchi Station's web page at the Nagoya Transportation Bureau's web site 

Railway stations in Japan opened in 1971
Railway stations in Aichi Prefecture
Stations of Nagoya Municipal Subway